The Principality of Eichstätt was a mediatised principality within the Kingdom of Bavaria that existed between 1817 and 1833 and encompassed an area around Eichstätt with about 24.000 residents. Proprietors of the principality were the Dukes of Leuchtenberg. In 1833 Bavaria rebought the principality and in 1855 finally for three million Gulden the remaining possessions of the Leuchtenberg heirs.

Princes:
Eugène de Beauharnais (1781–1824), 1817 Bavarian Duke of Leuchtenberg.
Auguste de Beauharnais (1810–1835), 2nd Duke of Leuchtenberg since 1824, son of the former.

External links 
 Hofstetten castle (de)
 Fürstentum Eichstätt 1817–1833 in Historischer Atlas von Bayern (de)

Eichstatt
Eichstätt